Polybus (Ancient Greek: Πόλυβος) was the king of Thebes (in Egypt) and husband of Alcandre. Menelaus and Helen stayed in his court for a while after the Trojan War. According to the Egyptian historian Manetho, Polybus  was identical to king Thuoris, who can be identified with the ruling queen Twosret.

Notes

Kings in Greek mythology

Reference 

 Homer, The Odyssey with an English Translation by A.T. Murray, PH.D. in two volumes. Cambridge, MA., Harvard University Press; London, William Heinemann, Ltd. 1919. . Online version at the Perseus Digital Library. Greek text available from the same website.

People from Thebes, Egypt